Mahmoud Solh (born Beirut, Lebanon) is a Lebanese agricultural economist and genetic scientist who was formerly the Director General of the International Center for Agricultural Research in the Dry Areas, ICARDA based in Beirut, Lebanon.

References

Lebanese economists
Scientists from Beirut
Food and Agriculture Organization officials
University of California, Davis alumni
Living people
Lebanese officials of the United Nations
Year of birth missing (living people)